Lawrence Saint-Victor (born June 14, 1982) is an American actor and writer, who was on the cast of the soap opera Guiding Light, playing Remy Boudreau from April 2006 until the soap's ending in September 2009. As of 2013, Saint-Victor is playing attorney Carter Walton on the American CBS Daytime soap opera The Bold and the Beautiful.

Early life and education
Born and raised in Rockland County, New York, Saint-Victor attended the State University of New York at Purchase.

Career
He portrayed Remy on Guiding Light between 2006 and 2009. Saint-Victor has been Carter on The Bold and Beautiful since 2013 and penned his first script for the soap that aired on January 16. Saint-Victor starred, wrote and co-produced the 2009 webseries, Wedlocked, alongside future The Bold and the Beautiful co-star Karla Mosley (Maya), who served as producer. He is in the 2015 film, Pass the Light.

Personal life 
He married his college sweetheart, Shay Flake, on September 1, 2007.

Filmography

Film

Television

Video games

References

External links

1982 births
American male soap opera actors
American male television actors
Living people
21st-century American male actors